This article shows all participating team squads at the 2018 Women's European Water Polo Championship, held in Spain from 14 to 27 July 2018.

Ages as of 14 July 2018.

Group A

Croatia
Head coach: Dragan Matutinović

France
Head coach: Florian Bruzzo

Greece
Head coach: Giorgos Morfesis

Israel
Head coach: Dimitrios Mavrotas

Italy
Head coach: Fabio Conti

Netherlands
Head coach: Arno Havenga

Group B

Germany
Head coach: Anja Skibba

Hungary
Head coach: Attila Biró

Russia
Head coach: Alexander Gaidukov

Serbia
Head coach: Dejan Jovović

Spain
Head coach: Miki Oca

Turkey
Head coach: Hakan Şahbaz

References

Women
Women's European Water Polo Championship
European Water Polo Championship squads
Euro